Addison C. Spruill (born May 14, 1993) is a professional basketball player for the Fukushima Firebonds of the Japanese B.League. He played collegiately for the University of North Carolina at Wilmington Seahawks of the Colonial Athletic Association. He was part of their 2015 Colonial Athletic Association championship team coached by Kevin Keatts.

High school years
Spruill was born in the Bronx, New York, and attended Pender High School in Burgaw, North Carolina.  He was a standout athlete that was a letterman in both football and basketball.  Spruill averaged 18.2 points, 8.1 rebounds and 3.2 assists for Pender High School.  He led the Patriots to 27-2 record and appearance in Eastern Regional final.

College years
Addison attended Brevard Community College and later transferred to the University of North Carolina at Wilmington (UNCW).

2014-15 (Senior)
 Named First-Team All-CAA after second and final season with Seahawks
 Started 30-of-32 appearances and led team in scoring with 14.2 points per game
 Also led team in rebounding with 6.5 rebounds each contest
 Led team's regulars in free throw accuracy with 73.0%
 Paced club in scoring 10 times and in rebounding 12 games
 Reached double figures in scoring in 26-of-32 games
 Scored 11 points and led team with eight rebounds in the CIT game at Sam Houston
 Had 12 points with four assists in the CAA semifinals vs. Northeastern
 Shared team lead with 19 points vs. Charleston in the CAA quarterfinals
 Went 7-of-10 from floor and 4-of-4 at foul line en route to 18 points vs. James Madison University
 Led team with 26 points, including 10-of-11 at free throw line, at Towson University
 Paced Seahawks with 16 points on 6-of-12 shooting vs. Northeastern
 Made all eight free throw attempts en route to 16 points vs. Charleston
 Went 6-of-16 from floor en route to 18 points at James Madison University
 Scored 19 points on 8-of-14 shooting at Drexel
 Came off the bench for first time this year and had 18 points in win over Towson
 Posted third career double-double with 11 points and 13 rebounds at Charleston
 Named CAA Player-of-the-Week for first time in career on Jan. 19
 Paced Seahawks for second straight game with 23 points at Hofstra
 Exploded for career-high 33 points on 12-of-16 shooting on 1/14/15 at William & Mary
 Posted second career double-double with 12 points and 11 rebounds vs. Drexel
 Scored 11 points with nine rebounds, four assists and four blocks vs. Delaware
 Scored 20 points in 35 minutes at Northeastern University
 Led team with 16 points at Ohio
 Scored 12 points with six rebounds at Minnesota
 Had 11 points and six rebounds vs. East Carolina
 Started sixth straight game and finished with four points and six boards at University of Louisville 
 Scored 13 points with four boards and four assists vs. St. Andrews
 Achieved first double-double with 17 points and 10 rebounds at Davidson
 Poured in career-high 20 points at Virginia Military Institute
 Led team with 15 points in season-opener at Old Dominion

2013-14 (Junior)
 Ranked second on team in scoring with 9.3 points per game in his first season with team
 Led the Seahawks in scoring five times and on the glass in four contests
 Also led squad in assists in four games
 Ranked third on the team in rebounding with 3.5 per game
 Finished with four points and two rebounds in the CAA Tournament loss to Hofstra
 Had six points and five rebounds in regular season finale vs. Delaware
 Finished with 10 points, two rebounds and three assists at William & Mary
 Had eight points, three rebounds and three assists at James Madison University
 Led team with 22 points and added five rebounds at Drexel
 Recorded 12th double figure game with 16 points off bench vs. University of Delaware
 Collected 12 points and seven rebounds vs. Hofstra
 Scored 11 points and had nine rebounds at Towson
 Contributed 15 points off bench vs. Manhattan
 Collected 15 points and five rebounds at East Carolina University
 Played 34 minutes and led team with 23 points vs. Stephen F. Austin
 Scored 19 points with five rebounds at Marshall
 Exploded for 24 points at Liberty, including 13-of-16 free throws
 Contributed 12 points in first career start against Iowa State on November 20, 2013
 Scored 10 points off bench in first career appearance at Iowa on November 8, 2013

Brevard Community College career
 Averaged 17.0 points, 6.7 rebounds and 3.2 assists in two seasons
 Played for Jeremy Schulman and powered the team to back-to-back 20-win seasons

Professional career
Addison began his professional basketball career in Japan while playing guard for the Hamamatsu Phoenix.  He later was a starting guard for the Al-Rayann_AC Lions.  He tried out with the Memphis Hustle but missed the final cut.  He currently plays with the Flyers Wels.

2018 Uber Arrest
On March 17, 2018 (St. Patrick's Day) Spruill was driving two passengers for the ride-sharing service Uber, when he was stopped for speeding. Upon searching the car, police found drugs and arrested Spruill on an outstanding warrant for intimidating a witness. Uber subsequently suspended his account. Spruill was cleared of charges brought against him.

References

Pro Baller

1993 births
Living people
American expatriate basketball people in Austria
American expatriate basketball people in Japan
American expatriate basketball people in Qatar
American men's basketball players
Basketball players from New York City
Earth Friends Tokyo Z players
Fukushima Firebonds players
Junior college men's basketball players in the United States
San-en NeoPhoenix players
UNC Wilmington Seahawks men's basketball players
Small forwards
Shooting guards